Nicoletta is a surname and feminine given name derived from the Greek Nikolaos, most often used in Italy, Sweden, Denmark and Norway. Nicoletta is also a surname.

Given name 
 Nicoletta (singer), full name Nicoletta Grisoni, French singer, known for the recording "Mamy Blue"
 Nicoletta Batini (born 1970), Italian economist
 Nicoletta Braschi (born 1960), Italian actress and film producer
 Nicoletta Caselin
 Nicoletta Ceccoli
 Nicoletta Costa
 Nicoletta Elmi
 Nicoletta Luciani
 Nicoletta Machiavelli
 Nicoletta Manni
 Nicoletta Mantovani, second wife of the singer Luciano Pavarotti
 Nicoletta Manzione
 Nicoletta Maraschio
 Nicoletta Massone
 Nicoletta Momigliano
 Nicoletta Orsomando
 Nicoletta Panni
 Nicoletta Pasquale
 Nicoletta Rizzi
 Nicoletta Romanoff
 Nicoletta Sacchi
 Nicoletta Strambelli (born 1948), Italian singer known as Patty Pravo
 Nicoletta Tinti
 Nicoletta Tozzi
 Nicoletta Vallorani, Italian science fiction writer

Surname 
 Daniel Nicoletta (born 1954), Italian-American photographer, photojournalist and gay rights activist
 John Nicoletta (1981–2008), American extreme skier

See also 

 Nicholas (name)
 Nicoleta
 Nikoletta

References 

Italian feminine given names